|}

The Peterborough Chase is a Grade 2 National Hunt chase in Great Britain which is open to horses aged four years or older. It is run at Huntingdon over a distance of about 2 miles and 4 furlongs (2 miles, 3 furlongs and 189 yards, or 3,995 metres), and during its running there are sixteen fences to be jumped. The race is currently scheduled in December.  In 2019, the race's total prize fund was £65,000.

A race called the Peterborough Handicap Chase, over three miles, was first run on Tuesday 2 December 1969. It was a new meeting with Huntingdon's fixture allocation having been increased from six days to nine days for the 1969/70 season. It remained a three-mile handicap chase until 1977, after which it became a conditions chase over 2½ miles.

The first running as a 2½ mile conditions chase was in 1978 when it was run as the F A Standen Chase. It was first run under the name of the Peterborough Chase in 1979.

From its inception in 1969 it was always run on a Tuesday until 1997. It was moved to a Saturday in 1998 and remained so until 2007. In 2008 it was first run on a Thursday.  The race was on a Sunday for the first time in 2014.

The only year the race was not run was in 1982 when the meeting was abandoned due to fog. In 1985 it was run as the Waterloo Meadows Centenary Chase.

The most successful horse in the race's history is Edredon Bleu, who won four consecutive runnings between 1998 and 2001. Wayward Lad (1981, 1983), Travado (1993, 1995),Racing Demon (2006, 2007) and Top Notch (2017, 2019) are the only other multiple winners of the race. The 2018 running was titled the Edredon Bleu Chase to honour the horse, who died in October 2018.

Courtesy of Edredon Bleu's four wins, Racing Demon's two victories and additional successes from triple-Gold Cup winner Best Mate (2002) and Impek (2005), Henrietta Knight is the joint most successful trainer of the Peterborough Chase, winning a total of eight renewals. Nicky Henderson has also trained eight winners, while Captain Tim Forster has trained four winners.

Desert Orchid, lining-up in the penultimate race of his long career, finished third in the 1991 Peterborough Chase. Ridden by Richard Dunwoody, the 12-year-old veteran finished third to Sabin Du Loir, beaten four lengths.

Records
Most successful horse (4 wins):
 Edredon Bleu – 1998, 1999, 2000, 2001

Leading jockey (4 wins):
 Richard Dunwoody – Very Promising (1987), Remittance Man (1992), Travado (1995), One Man (1997) 
 Jim Culloty – Edredon Bleu (1998, 1999, 2000), Best Mate (2002)

Leading trainer (8 wins):
 Nicky Henderson – Remittance Man (1992), Travado (1993, 1995), Riverside Theatre (2013), Josses Hill (2016), Top Notch (2017, 2019), Mister Fisher (2020) 
 Henrietta Knight - Edredon Bleu (1998, 1999, 2000, 2001), Best Mate (2002), Impek (2005), Racing Demon (2006, 2007)

Winners since 1978

See also
 Horse racing in Great Britain
 List of British National Hunt races

References

 Racing Post:

 pedigreequery.com – Peterborough Chase – Huntingdon.

National Hunt races in Great Britain
Huntingdon Racecourse
National Hunt chases